Natalie Forrest (born  in Western Australia) is an Australian television presenter and currently is the news presenter for 10 News First: Perth. 

Forrest started her career in journalism in 1997 in Albany, Western Australia as a TV journalist for Golden West Network, before moving to Bunbury, Western Australia as Chief of Staff and sports presenter. She also worked weekends at 7 Perth as a casual journalist.

In 2004, Forrest moved to Canberra to present Prime Television news updates across New South Wales, Victoria, and the Australian Capital Territory.

In 2008, Forrest participated in a Group Study Exchange to Indiana, USA, sponsored by Rotary.

Forrest has a Bachelor of Arts from Edith Cowan University in Western Australia, with a double major in English and Media. She also teaches Broadcast Journalism and presenting to camera at Canberra Institute of Technology.
From March 13, 2023, it was announced Natalie will host 10 News First after the bulletin was returned to the Perth studios. 

Forrest lives in Perth with her husband Clinton, whom she married in 2003.

References

External links
 https://twitter.com/nat_forrest

1973 births
Living people
People from Albany, Western Australia
Seven News presenters